Luis Regueiro Urquiola (born 22 December 1943) is a Mexican former footballer who played as a midfielder.

Career
He played for Mexico national team in the 1966 FIFA World Cup. He also played for Club Universidad Nacional.

His father, also named Luis Regueiro, was himself an international footballer, but for Spain, who settled and raised a family in Mexico after being part of the Euzkadi squad which toured abroad during the Spanish Civil War.

References

External links
FIFA profile

1943 births
Mexico international footballers
Footballers from Mexico City
Mexican people of Basque descent
Association football midfielders
Club Universidad Nacional footballers
Liga MX players
1966 FIFA World Cup players
Living people
Pan American Games medalists in football
Pan American Games gold medalists for Mexico
Mexican footballers
Footballers at the 1967 Pan American Games
Medalists at the 1967 Pan American Games